Somchai Chuayboonchum (Thai สมชาย ชวยบุญชุม) is a Thai football coach and former footballer. He played as midfielder for Thailand national team. He was most recently the head coach of Thai League 2 club Chiangmai United.

Managerial statistics

Honours

Manager
Thailand U-19
 2011 AFF U-19 Youth Championship : 2011

Nongbua Pitchaya
 Thai League 2 Champions : 2020–21

Samut Songkhram
 Thai Division 1 League Runner-Up : 2007

Individual
Thai League 1 Coach of the Month (1): July 2016

References

See also 
 Wikipedia in Thai

Somchai Chuayboonchum
Somchai Chuayboonchum
Somchai Chuayboonchum
Living people
1954 births
Somchai Chuayboonchum
Association football midfielders
Somchai Chuayboonchum
Somchai Chuayboonchum
Somchai Chuayboonchum
Somchai Chuayboonchum
Southeast Asian Games medalists in football
Competitors at the 1979 Southeast Asian Games